Blankets is an autobiographical graphic novel by Craig Thompson, published in 2003 by Top Shelf Productions. As a coming-of-age autobiography, the book tells the story of Thompson's childhood in an Evangelical Christian family, his first love, and his early adulthood. The book was widely acclaimed, with Time magazine ranking it #1 in its 2003 Best Comics list, and #8 in its Best Comics of the Decade.

Publication history
In late 1999, Thompson began work on the graphic novel, which was published three and a half years later in 2003. Thompson produced the book as a way of coming out to his parents about no longer being a Christian.

Main characters
Craig Thompson: Craig is the main character, who is depicted from childhood to young adulthood. Craig is a talented artist and devout Christian. At a Baptist Christian winter camp he meets a girl from a similar background named Raina who becomes his first love.
Phil: Craig's younger brother. Like Craig, he likes to draw, and the first portion of the story details their childhood together, though they later drift apart. Their adventures are also recalled at least once in each chapter throughout the book.
Raina: Craig's first love, a fellow Christian whom Craig first meets at a church camp. Like Craig, her family is not well-off financially, and her parents' divorce causes her stress. She also takes care of her mentally disabled sister and brother.  Although she believes in God, she does not believe as strongly as Craig does. 
Craig's parents: Craig's parents are strict, devoutly religious Christians who are not very tolerant of liberal Christianity.
Raina's father:  Raina's father is a man who is loyal to his own beliefs and is hoping to salvage his relationship with his wife.
Raina's mother:  Raina's mother has no interest in repairing her relationship with her husband, and is trying to move on. Both she and her husband leave Raina to take care of her adopted siblings, as well as her niece. After being away from the home all day and upon returning, she frequented the medicine cabinet for some prescription drugs to retreat to her bedroom alone.   
Laura and Ben: Raina's adopted sister and brother, both of whom are mentally disabled. Ben is a far more quiet and collected person, whereas Laura is far more energetic. It's implied that Ben has Down syndrome; Laura's disability is not specified, but she functions at the level of a very young child.
Julie and Dave: Raina's sister and brother-in-law.

Synopsis

Blankets chronicles Craig's adolescence and young adulthood, his childhood relationship with his younger brother, and the conflicts he experiences regarding Christianity and his first love. Though written chronologically, Thompson uses flashbacks as a literary and artistic device in order to parallel young adult experience with past childhood experience. Major literary themes of the work include: first love, child and adult sexuality, spirituality, sibling relationships, and coming of age.

Craig begins by describing his relationship with his brother during their childhood in Wisconsin. They have devoutly religious parents. Thompson also depicts a male babysitter sexually abusing both Craig and his younger brother, Phil. Craig suffers harassment from bullies at school and at church.

Through his teen years, he continues to find it hard to fit in with his peers, but at Bible camp one winter, he comes to associate with a group of outcast teens which includes a girl named Raina, who develops an interest in Craig. The two become inseparable, and continue their relationship through letters and phone calls. They arrange to spend two weeks together at Raina's home in Michigan's Upper Peninsula.

Craig arrives and meets Raina's family, which includes her two adopted siblings, Ben and Laura, her older biological sister Julie, and her parents, who are undergoing a divorce. Raina feels responsible for taking care of Ben and Laura, who are mentally disabled, as well as Julie's newborn daughter. Despite growing closer during the visit, the two return to their separate lives, but Raina eventually decides to break off the relationship. They maintain a friendship for a time, talking on the phone with diminishing frequency (and increasing inanity). Ultimately, Craig tells Raina that their friendship, too, is over. Craig then destroys everything Raina had ever given to him, and every memento of their relationship, except for the quilt she made. He stores it in the attic of his childhood home, and moves out to start his own life elsewhere. Craig comes to terms with religion and his spiritual identity while away from his family, and confides in his brother that he is no longer a Christian, but still believes in God and the teachings of Jesus. He returns to his childhood home after several years, seemingly a different person.

Reception

The Bloomsbury Review called it "a superb example of the art of cartooning: the blending of word and picture to achieve an effect that neither is capable of without the other." Time stated that Thompson's work "has set new bars for the medium not just in length, but breadth" and listed it as #1 in its 2003 Best Comics of the Year list, and ranked it as #8 in its 10 Best Comics of the Decade. The book was called a "magnum opus" in the inaugural issue of (Cult)ure Magazine. Publishers Weekly wrote that "Thompson manages to explore adolescent social yearnings, the power of young love and the complexities of sexual attraction with a rare combination of sincerity, pictorial lyricism and taste".

As a result of Blankets, he rose quickly to the top ranks of American cartoonists in both popularity and critical esteem.  Pulitzer Prize-winning comic artist Art Spiegelman sent him a long letter of praise for the work, and in mock-jealousy, Eddie Campbell expressed a temptation to break Thompson's fingers. Another Pulitzer Prize-winning comic author, Jules Feiffer, wrote that Thompson's "expert blending of words and pictures and resonant silences makes for a transcendent kind of story-telling that grabs you as you read it and stays with you after you put it down". Alan Moore praised the book in interviews as "an incredibly heartwarming human document" adding that he found it "touching and engrossing", and publicly defended it when it was attacked as pornography (see below). Neil Gaiman wrote, "I thought it was moving, tender, beautifully drawn, painfully honest, and probably the most important graphic novel since Jimmy Corrigan".

Thompson said that he believes Blankets was a success because he was "reacting against all of the over-the-top, explosive action genre [in alternative comics, and] I also didn't want to do anything cynical and nihilistic, which is the standard for a lot of alternative comics." Despite the praise heaped upon the book, it resulted in tension between Thompson and his parents for a couple of years after they read it.

In October 2006, a resident of Marshall, Missouri, attempted to have Blankets and Fun Home by Alison Bechdel removed from the city's public library.  Supporters of the books' removal characterized them as "pornography" and expressed concern that they would be read by children. Marshall Public Library Director Amy Crump defended the books as having been well-reviewed in "reputable, professional book review journals," and characterized the removal attempt as a step towards "the slippery slope of censorship". On October 11, 2006, the library's board appointed a committee to create a materials selection policy, and removed Blankets and Fun Home from circulation until the new policy was approved. The committee "decided not to assign a prejudicial label or segregate [the books] by a prejudicial system", and presented a materials selection policy to the board. On March 14, 2007, the Marshall Public Library Board of Trustees voted to return both Blankets and Fun Home to the library's shelves.

Awards
 2004 Harvey Award for Best Artist
 2004 Harvey Award for Best Cartoonist
 2004 Harvey Award for Best Graphic Album of Original Work
 2004 Eisner Award for Best Graphic Album
 2004 Eisner Award for Best Writer/Artist
 2004 Ignatz Award for Outstanding Artist
 2004 Ignatz Award for Outstanding Graphic Novel or Collection
 2005 Prix de la critique

Editions

Editions are available in English, Catalan, French, Spanish, German, Danish, Dutch, Italian, Czech, Polish, Hungarian, Slovenian, Estonian, Greek, Serbian, Norwegian and Portuguese. Additionally, the English, Serbian and Dutch versions were available in a limited-edition hardcover volume and Polish was available with special cover jacket for those who pre-ordered the book. There is also an accompanying soundtrack, recorded by the Portland, Oregon-based band Tracker. The French, Spanish, and Italian editions all have different cover art. The first Italian edition has a red spine, while subsequent editions have a blue one.

Blankets (English paperback edition) , Top Shelf Productions
Blankets – Manteau de Neige (French edition) , Casterman, March 2004
Blankets (Spanish edition) , Astiberri Ediciones, April 2004
Blankets (Catalan edition)  Astiberri Ediciones, April 2004
Blankets (German edition) , Speed Comics, May 2004
Een Deken Van Sneeuw (Dutch edition) , Oog & Blik, May 2004
Blankets (Italian edition) , Coconino Press, November 2004
Pod dekou (Czech edition) , BB Art, November 2005
Blankets. Pod śnieżną kołderką (Polish edition) , Timof i Cisi Wspólnicy, December 2006
Blankets (Greek edition) , Εκδόσεις ΚΨΜ, March 2007
Tepper (Norwegian edition)  Egmont Serieforlaget AS, 2006
Retalhos (Brazilian edition)  Cia das Letras, 2009
Blankets (Portuguese edition)  Biblioteca da Alice, 2011
En dyne af sne (Danish edition)  Forlaget Fahrenheit, 2008
담요 (Korean edition) , 박여영 번역, 미메시스, 2012
Blankets. Ispod pokrivača (Serbian edition) , Komiko, 2014
Blankets – Takarók (Hungarian edition) , Vad Virágok Könyvműhely, 2018
Blankets. Lumeteki all (Estonian edition) , Pythagorase Püksid, 2021

References

2003 graphic novels
2003 comics debuts
Comics by Craig Thompson
Autobiographical graphic novels
Eisner Award winners for Best Graphic Album: New
Harvey Award winners for Best Graphic Album of Original Work
Ignatz Award winners for Outstanding Graphic Novel or Collection